Joaquín Fernández Corredor (born January 22, 1971, in Mataró, Catalonia) is a former medley and breaststroke swimmer from Spain. He competed at three consecutive Summer Olympics for his native country, starting in 1988 in Seoul, South Korea.

References
 Spanish Olympic Committee

1971 births
Living people
Spanish male medley swimmers
Spanish male breaststroke swimmers
Male medley swimmers
Olympic swimmers of Spain
Swimmers at the 1988 Summer Olympics
Swimmers at the 1992 Summer Olympics
Swimmers at the 1996 Summer Olympics
Medalists at the FINA World Swimming Championships (25 m)
Mediterranean Games silver medalists for Spain
Mediterranean Games bronze medalists for Spain
Mediterranean Games medalists in swimming
Swimmers at the 1991 Mediterranean Games
20th-century Spanish people